The 2012 Southeast Missouri State Redhawks football team represented Southeast Missouri State University as a member of the Ohio Valley Conference (OVC) during the 2012 NCAA Division I FCS football season. Led by seventh-year head coach Tony Samuel, the Redhawks compiled an overall record of 3–8 with a mark of 2–6 in conference play, placing seventh in the OVC. Southeast Missouri State played home games at Houck Stadium in Cape Girardeau, Missouri.

Schedule

References

Southeast Missouri State
Southeast Missouri State Redhawks football seasons
Southeast Missouri State Redhawks football